Modafinil, sold under the brand name Provigil among others, is a central nervous system (CNS) stimulant medication used to treat sleepiness due to narcolepsy, shift work sleep disorder, and obstructive sleep apnea. While it has seen off-label use as a purported cognitive enhancer to improve wakefulness in animal and human studies, the research on its effectiveness for this use is not conclusive. Modafinil is taken by mouth.

Modafinil’s side effects include headaches, anxiety, excessive adrenal gland overproduction, and nausea. Serious side effects in high doses include delusions, unfounded beliefs, paranoia, irrational thought, and transient depression, possibly due to its effects on dopamine receptors in the brain, as well as allergic reactions. The amount of medication used should be adjusted in those with kidney problems, as this medication has markedly increased side effects during renal insufficiency.

It is not recommended in those with an arrhythmia, significant hypertension, or left ventricular hypertrophy. Modafinil appears to work by acting on dopamine and modulating the areas of the brain involved with the sleep cycle.

Originally developed in the 1970s by French neuroscientist Michel Jouvet and Lafon Laboratories, Modafinil has been prescribed in France since 1994, and was approved for medical use in the United States in 1998. In the United States it is classified as a schedule IV controlled substance, although its classification has been called into question. In the United Kingdom it is a prescription only medication. It is available as a generic medication. In 2020, modafinil was the 302nd most commonly prescribed medication in the United States, with just over 1,000,000 prescriptions.

Usage

Uses

Medical
Modafinil is not considered to be a classical psychostimulant, but rather is classified as a eugeroic (wakefulness-promoting drug).

Sleep disorders
Modafinil is used primarily for treatment of narcolepsy, shift work sleep disorder, and excessive daytime sleepiness associated with obstructive sleep apnea. For obstructive sleep apnea, it is recommended that continuous positive airway pressure (CPAP) be appropriately used before considering starting modafinil to help with daytime sleepiness. Because of the risk for development of skin or hypersensitivity reactions and serious adverse psychiatric reactions, the European Medicines Agency has recommended that new patient prescriptions should be only to treat sleepiness associated with narcolepsy.

Fatigue
Modafinil is suggested for helping with multiple sclerosis (MS) fatigue by the UK National Institute for Health and Care Excellence (NICE) and by MS NGOs.

Occupational

Of French origin, Modafinil was fielded to military personnel in the Air Force, Foreign Legion and Marine infantry during the 1st Gulf War. Being more efficient than its parent drug adrafinil, it was deemed combat-worthy by French Ministry of Defense in 1989 and subsequently administered to personnel by their officers under the name Virgyl, in order to improve a unit's operational tempo. The test took place before the introduction of modafinil as medication, and the personnel involved were not informed of the product's nature.

Since then, armed forces of several countries including the United States, the United Kingdom, India and France, have expressed interest in modafinil as an alternative to amphetamine—the drug traditionally employed in combat situations or lengthy missions where troops face sleep deprivation. The French government indicated that the Foreign Legion used modafinil during certain covert operations. The United Kingdom's Ministry of Defence commissioned research into modafinil from QinetiQ and spent £300,000 on one investigation. In 2011, the Indian Air Force announced that modafinil was included in contingency plans.

In the United States military, modafinil has been approved for use on certain Air Force missions, and it is being investigated for other uses. As of November 2012, modafinil is the only drug approved by the Air Force as a "go pill" for fatigue management (replacing prior use of amphetamine-based medications such as dextroamphetamine). It is also used in various Special Forces.

The Canadian Medical Association Journal also reports that modafinil is used by astronauts on long-term missions aboard the International Space Station. Modafinil is "available to crew to optimize performance while fatigued" and helps with the disruptions in circadian rhythms and with the reduced quality of sleep astronauts experience.

Nootropic
Modafinil has been used non-medically as a "smart drug" by students, office workers, soldiers and transhumanists. As a 'smart drug' it allegedly increases mental focus and helps evade sleep, properties that attract students, professionals in the corporate and tech fields, air-force personnel, surgeons, truck drivers and call-center workers.

Treatment of cocaine addiction 
Modafinil binds to the dopamine transporter (DAT) in an occluded conformation, differently than cocaine and methylphenidate. Subjects pre-treated with modafinil report experiencing less euphoria from cocaine administration. Modafinil does not potentiate self-administration of cocaine in pretreated Sprague-Dawley rats.

The mechanism by which modafinil inhibits cocaine self-administration is likely more complex than the simple observation that modafinil occupies the DAT, as drugs like methylphenidate (another dopamine re-uptake inhibitor) fail to reduce cocaine self-administration.

Available forms

Modafinil is available in the form of 100 and 200 mg oral tablets. It is also available as the (R)-enantiomer, armodafinil, and as a prodrug of modafinil, adrafinil.

Drug tolerance
Large-scale clinical studies have found no evidence of fading impact over time (tolerance) with modafinil at therapeutic doses even with prolonged use (for forty weeks and as long as three years).

Contraindications
Modafinil is contraindicated in people with known hypersensitivity to modafinil or armodafinil. Modafinil is not approved for use in children for any medical conditions, in whom there is a higher risk of rare but serious dermatological toxicity.

Adverse effects
The incidence of adverse effects are reported as the following: less than 10% of users report having a headache, nausea, and decreased appetite. Between 5% to 10% of users may be affected with anxiety, insomnia, dizziness, diarrhea, and rhinitis. Modafinil-associated psychiatric reactions have occurred in those with and without a pre-existing psychiatric history. No clinically significant changes in body weight have been observed with modafinil in clinical trials, although decreased appetite and weight loss have been reported with modafinil in children and adolescents probably due to the much higher modafinil exposure in these individuals based on body weight (i.e., mg/kg doses).

Rare occurrences have been reported of more serious adverse effects, including severe skin rashes and other symptoms that are probably allergy-related. From the date of initial marketing, December 1998, to January 30, 2007, the US Food and Drug Administration received six cases of severe cutaneous adverse reactions associated with modafinil, including erythema multiforme (EM), Stevens–Johnson syndrome (SJS), toxic epidermal necrolysis (TEN), and DRESS syndrome, involving adult and pediatric patients. The FDA issued a relevant alert. In the same alert, the FDA also noted that angioedema and multi-organ hypersensitivity reactions have also been reported in postmarketing experiences. In 2007, the FDA ordered Cephalon to modify the Provigil leaflet in bold-face print of several serious and potentially fatal conditions attributed to modafinil use, including TEN, DRESS syndrome, and SJS.

The long term safety and effectiveness of modafinil have not been determined. However, a recent longitudinal study in pediatric patients for narcolepsy for up to 10 years demonstrated that modafinil and armodafinil were safe and effective with the study concluding that use of modafinil and armodafinil significantly improved patient's ability to stay awake and did not exacerbate preexisting psychiatric conditions.

Addiction and dependence
The addiction and dependence liabilities of modafinil are very low. It shares biochemical mechanisms with addictive stimulant drugs, and some studies have reported it to have similar mood-elevating properties, although to a lesser degree. It is not clear whether these effects are any more different than the ones from caffeine. Modafinil does not appear to produce euphoric effects nor deviations (i.e. abuse) from assigned dosages to the patient.

Modafinil is classified by the United States FDA as a schedule IV controlled substance, a category for drugs with valid medical uses and low addiction potential. The International Narcotics Control Board does not consider modafinil a narcotic nor a psychotropic substance. In fact, modafinil may increase abstinence rates in a subgroup of cocaine addicts while modafinil-related discontinuation adverse effects are no different from placebo.

Overdose
In mice and rats, the median lethal dose (LD50) of modafinil is approximately or slightly greater than 1250 mg/kg. Oral LD50 values reported for rats range from 1000 to 3400 mg/kg. Intravenous LD50 for dogs is 300 mg/kg. Clinical trials on humans involving taking up to 1200 mg/day for 7–21 days and known incidents of acute one-time overdoses up to 4500 mg did not appear to cause life-threatening effects, although a number of adverse experiences were observed, including excitation or agitation, insomnia, anxiety, irritability, aggressiveness, confusion, nervousness, tremor, palpitations, sleep disturbances, nausea, and diarrhea. As of 2004, the FDA is not aware of any fatal overdoses involving modafinil alone (as opposed to multiple drugs including modafinil).

Interactions 

Coadministration with opioids such as methadone, hydrocodone, oxycodone and fentanyl may result in a drop in opioid plasma concentrations, because modafinil is an inducer of the CYP3A4 enzymes. If not monitored closely, reduced efficacy or withdrawal symptoms can occur. Modafinil may have an adverse effect on hormonal contraceptives for up to a month after discontinuation. In a 2006 study, a single dose of modafinil 200 mg caused a decrease in blood prolactin levels, although it did not affect human growth hormone or thyroid-stimulating hormone. Since modafinil can induce the activity of the CYP3A4 enzyme involved in cortisol clearance, modafinil may reduce the bioavailability of hydrocortisone. Therefore, it may be necessary to adjust the steroid substitution dose in subjects receiving CYP3A4-metabolism-inducing drugs such as modafinil. Modafinil is classified as a weak to moderate inducer of CYP3A4.

Pharmacology

Pharmacodynamics

Mechanism of action
 the precise therapeutic mechanism of action of modafinil for narcolepsy and sleep-wake disorders remains unknown. Modafinil acts as an atypical, selective, and weak dopamine reuptake inhibitor and indirectly activates the release of orexin neuropeptides and histamine from the lateral hypothalamus and tuberomammillary nucleus, respectively all of which may contribute to heightened arousal.

Dopamine reuptake inhibitor
Research found that modafinil elevates dopamine levels in the hypothalamus in animals. The locus of the monoamine action of modafinil was also the target of studies, with effects identified on dopamine in the striatum and, in particular, nucleus accumbens, norepinephrine in the hypothalamus and ventrolateral preoptic nucleus, and serotonin in the amygdala and frontal cortex. Modafinil was screened at a large panel of receptors and transporters in an attempt to elucidate its pharmacology. Of the sites tested, it was found to significantly affect only the dopamine transporter (DAT), acting as a dopamine reuptake inhibitor (DRI) with an IC50 value of 4 μM. Subsequently, it was determined that modafinil binds to the same site on the DAT as cocaine, but in a different manner. In accordance, modafinil increases locomotor activity and extracellular dopamine concentrations in animals in a manner similar to the selective DRI vanoxerine (GBR-12909), and also inhibits methamphetamine-induced dopamine release (a common property of DRIs, since DAT transport facilitates methamphetamine's access to its intracellular targets). As such, "modafinil is an exceptionally weak, but apparently very selective, [DAT] inhibitor". In addition to animal research, a human positron emission tomography (PET) imaging study found that 200 mg and 300 mg doses of modafinil resulted in DAT occupancy of 51.4% and 56.9%, respectively, which was described as "close to that of methylphenidate". Another human PET imaging study similarly found that modafinil occupied the DAT and also determined that it significantly elevated extracellular levels of dopamine in the brain, including in the nucleus accumbens.

Modafinil has been described as an "atypical" DAT inhibitor, and shows a profile of effects that is very different from those of other dopaminergic stimulants. For instance, modafinil produces wakefulness reportedly without the need for compensatory sleep, and shows relatively low, if any, potential for abuse. Aside from modafinil, examples of other atypical DAT inhibitors include vanoxerine and benztropine, which have a relatively low abuse potential similar to modafinil. These drugs appear to interact molecularly with the DAT in a distinct way relative to "conventional" DAT blockers such as cocaine and methylphenidate. Analogues of modafinil with modafinil-like versus cocaine-like dopamine reuptake inhibition and effects have been synthesized.

Dopamine transporter-independent actions
Against the hypothesis that modafinil exerts its effects by acting as a DRI, tyrosine hydroxylase inhibitors (which deplete dopamine) fail to block the effects of modafinil in animals. In addition, modafinil fails to reverse reserpine-induced akinesia, whereas dextroamphetamine, a dopamine releasing agent (DRA), is able to do so. Moreover, one of the first published structure–activity relationship studies of modafinil found in 2012 that DAT inhibition did not correlate with wakefulness-promoting effects in animals among modafinil analogues. Additionally, a variety of analogues without any significant inhibition of the DAT still produced wakefulness-promoting effects. Furthermore, "[the] neurochemical effects [of modafinil] and anatomical pattern of brain area activation differ from typical psychostimulants and are consistent with its beneficial effects on cognitive performance processes such as attention, learning, and memory". Another study found that modafinil-induced increased locomotor activity in animals was dependent on histamine release and could be abolished by depletion of neuronal histamine, whereas those of methylphenidate were not and could not be. Taken together, although it is established that modafinil is a clinically significant DRI, its full pharmacology remains unclear and may be more complex than this single property—as it may also include DAT-independent actions. One such action may be activation of the orexin system.

In any case, there is nonetheless a good deal of evidence to indicate that modafinil is producing at least a portion of its wakefulness-promoting effects by acting as a DRI, or at least via activation of the dopaminergic system. In support of modafinil acting as a dopaminergic agent, its wakefulness-promoting effects are abolished in DAT knockout mice (although DAT knockout mice show D1 and D2 receptor and norepinephrine compensatory abnormalities that might confound this finding), reduced by both D1 and D2 receptor antagonists (although conflicting reports exist), and completely blocked by simultaneous inactivation of both D1 and D2 receptors. In accordance, modafinil shows full stimulus generalization to other DAT inhibitors including cocaine, methylphenidate, and vanoxerine, and discrimination is blocked by administration of both ecopipam (SCH-39166), a D1 receptor antagonist, and haloperidol, a D2 receptor antagonist. Partial substitution was seen with the DRA dextroamphetamine and the D2 receptor agonist PNU-91356A, as well as with nicotine (which indirectly elevates dopamine levels through activation of nicotinic acetylcholine receptors).

Modafinil may possess yet an additional mechanism of action. Both modafinil and its metabolite, modafinil sulfone, possess anticonvulsant properties in animals, and modafinil sulfone is nearly as potent as modafinil in producing this effect. However, modafinil sulfone lacks any wakefulness-promoting effects in animals, indicating that a distinct mechanism may be at play in the anticonvulsant effects of both compounds.

Dopamine D2 receptor partial agonist
Armodafinil, the (R)-enantiomer of modafinil, was also subsequently found to act as a D2High receptor partial agonist, with a Ki of 16 nM, an intrinsic activity of 48%, and an EC50 of 120 nM, in rat striatal tissue. Esmodafinil, the (S)-enantiomer of modafinil, is inactive with respect to the D2 receptor. Modafinil has been found to directly inhibit the firing of midbrain dopaminergic neurons in the ventral tegmental area and substantia nigra of rats via activation of D2 receptors. However, modafinil has also been reported not to interact with the human D2 receptor (Ki = >10 μM).

Dampening of amygdala activity 
Although modafinil enhances the efficiency of prefrontal cortical information processing, there is also some human and mouse evidence to suggest that modafinil conversely reduces amygdala activity (both through direct fMRI observation and anxiety questionnaires). The amygdala is highly involved in fear processing, and the dampening of its activity reduces perceptions of fear in response to environmental stress. At least one study has documented a statistically significant reduction in fear response in human subjects given 100 mg of modafinil daily for 7 days. However, another study investigating the acute effects of modafinil on fear processing reported an increase in amygdala responses to fearful faces after administration of 600 mg of modafinil in human subjects.

Other actions
An in vitro study predicts that modafinil may induce the cytochrome P450 enzymes CYP1A2, CYP3A4, and CYP2B6, as well as may inhibit CYP2C9 and CYP2C19. However, an in-vitro studies find no significant inhibition of CYP2C9. It may also induce P-glycoprotein, which may affect drugs transported by P-glycoprotein, such as digoxin.

Pharmacokinetics
Cmax (peak levels) occurs approximately 2 to 3 hours after administration. Food slows absorption, but does not affect the total AUC. In vitro measurements indicate that 60% of modafinil is bound to plasma proteins at clinical concentrations of the drug. This percentage changes very little when the concentration of modafinil is varied.

Renal excretion of unchanged modafinil accounts for less than 10% of an oral dose. The two major circulating metabolites of modafinil are modafinil acid (CRL-40467) and modafinil sulfone (CRL-41056). Both of these metabolites have been described as inactive, and neither appear to contribute to the wakefulness-promoting effects of modafinil. However, modafinil sulfone does appear to possess anticonvulsant effects, a property that it shares with modafinil.

Elimination half-life is generally in the range of 10 to 12 hours, subject to differences in CYP genotypes, liver function and renal function. It is metabolized in the liver, and its inactive metabolite is excreted in the urine. Urinary excretion of the unchanged drug ranges from 0% to as high as 18.7%, depending on various factors.

Chemistry

Enantiomers

Modafinil is a racemic mixture of two enantiomers, armodafinil ((R)-modafinil) and esmodafinil ((S)-modafinil).

Detection in body fluids
Modafinil and/or its major metabolite, modafinil acid, may be quantified in plasma, serum or urine to monitor dosage in those receiving the drug therapeutically, to confirm a diagnosis of poisoning in hospitalized patients or to assist in the forensic investigation of a vehicular traffic violation. Instrumental techniques involving gas or liquid chromatography are usually employed for these purposes. As of 2011, it is not specifically tested for by common drug screens (except for anti-doping screens) and is unlikely to cause false positives for other chemically unrelated drugs such as substituted amphetamines.

Reagent testing can be used to screen for the presence of modafinil in samples.

Structural analogues
Many derivatives and structural analogues of modafinil have been synthesized and studied. Examples of these analogues include adrafinil, CE-123, fladrafinil (CRL-40941; fluorafinil), flmodafinil (CRL-40940; bisfluoromodafinil, lauflumide), and modafinil sulfone (CRL-41056).

History
Modafinil was originally developed in France by neurophysiologist professor Michel Jouvet and Lafon Laboratories. Modafinil originated with the 1970s invention of a series of benzhydryl sulfinyl compounds, including adrafinil, which was first offered as an experimental treatment for narcolepsy in France in 1986. Modafinil is the primary metabolite of adrafinil, lacking the polar -OH group on its terminal amide, and has similar activity to the parent drug but is much more widely used. It has been prescribed in France since 1994 under the name Modiodal, and in the US since 1998 as Provigil.

In 1998, modafinil was approved by the U.S. Food and Drug Administration for the treatment of narcolepsy and in 2003 for shift work sleep disorder and obstructive sleep apnea/hypopnea even though caffeine and amphetamine were shown to be more wakefulness promoting on the Stanford Sleepiness Test Score than modafinil.

It was approved for use in the UK in December 2002. Modafinil is marketed in the United States by Cephalon, who originally leased the rights from Lafon, but eventually purchased the company in 2001.

Cephalon began to market armodafinil, the (R)-enantiomer of modafinil, in the United States in 2007. After protracted patent litigation and negotiations (see below), generic versions of modafinil became available in the US in 2012.

Patent protection and litigation
 was issued to Laboratoire L. Lafon on May 22, 1990, covering the chemical compound modafinil. After receiving an interim term extension of 1066 days and pediatric exclusivity of six months, it expired on October 22, 2010. On October 6, 1994, Cephalon filed an additional patent, covering modafinil in the form of particles of defined size. That patent,  was issued on April 8, 1997. It was reissued in 2002 as RE 37,516, which surrendered the 5618845 patent. With pediatric exclusivity, this patent expired on April 6, 2015.

On December 24, 2002, anticipating the expiration of exclusive marketing rights, generic drug manufacturers Mylan, Teva, Barr, and Ranbaxy applied to the FDA to market a generic form of modafinil. At least one withdrew its application after early opposition by Cephalon based on the RE 37,516 patent. There is some question of whether a particle size patent is sufficient protection against the manufacture of generics. Pertinent questions include whether modafinil may be modified or manufactured to avoid the granularities specified in the new Cephalon patent, and whether patenting particle size is invalid because particles of appropriate sizes are likely to be obvious to practitioners skilled in the art. However, under United States patent law, a patent is entitled to a legal presumption of validity, meaning that in order to invalidate the patent, much more than "pertinent questions" are required.

As of October 31, 2011, U.S. Reissue Patent No. RE 37,516 has been declared invalid and unenforceable. The District Court for the Eastern District of Pennsylvania ruled that RE 37,516 was invalid because it: (1) was on sale more than one year prior to the date of the application in violation of 35 U.S.C. section 102(b); (2) was actually invented by someone else (the French company Laboratoire L. Lafon); (3) was obvious at the time the invention was made to a person having ordinary skill in the art under 35 U.S.C. section 103(a); and (4) failed the written description requirement of 35 U.S.C. section 112. The patent was also found to be unenforceable due to Cephalon's inequitable conduct during patent prosecution.

Cephalon made an agreement with four major generics manufacturers Teva, Barr Pharmaceuticals, Ranbaxy Laboratories, and Watson Pharmaceuticals between 2005 and 2006 to delay sales of generic modafinil in the US until April 2012 by these companies in exchange for upfront and royalty payments. Litigation arising from these agreements is still pending including an FTC suit filed in April 2008. Apotex received regulatory approval in Canada despite a suit from Cephalon's marketing partner in Canada, Shire Pharmaceuticals. Cephalon has sued Apotex in the US to prevent it from releasing a genericized armodafinil (Nuvigil). Cephalon's 2011 attempt to merge with Teva was approved by the FTC under a number of conditions, including granting generic US rights to another company; ultimately, Par Pharmaceutical acquired the US modafinil rights as well as some others.

In the United Kingdom, Mylan Inc. received regulatory approval to sell generic modafinil produced by Orchid in January 2010; Cephalon sued to prevent sale, but lost the patent trial in November.

Society and culture

Brand names
Modafinil is sold under a wide variety of brand names worldwide, including Alertec, Alertex, Altasomil, Aspendos, Forcilin, Intensit, Mentix, Modafinil, Modafinilo, Modalert, Modanil, Modasomil, Modvigil, Modiodal, Modiwake, Movigil, Provigil, Resotyl, Stavigile, Vigia, Vigicer, Vigil, Vigimax, Wakelert and Zalux.

Legal status

Australia 
In Australia, modafinil is considered to be a Schedule 4 prescription-only medicine or prescription animal remedy. Schedule 4 is defined as "Substances, the use or supply of which should be by or on the order of persons permitted by State or Territory legislation to prescribe and should be available from a pharmacist on prescription."

Canada 
In Canada, modafinil is not listed in the Controlled Drugs and Substances Act, but it is a Schedule F prescription drug, so it is subject to seizure by Canada Border Services Agency.

China
In mainland China, modafinil is strictly controlled like other stimulants, such as amphetamines and methylphenidate. It has been classified as Class I psychotropic drug, meaning that only doctors who have the right to prescribe narcotics and Class I psychotropic drugs (usually through special examination) can prescribe it for no more than three-day use (or seven-day use for control/extend-release products). The first and only modafinil products was approved in November 2017, but its marketing status in mainland China is still unknown.

Japan
In Japan, modafinil is Schedule I psychotropic drug. Cephalon has licensed Alfresa Corporation to produce, and Mitsubishi Tanabe Pharma to sell modafinil products under the trade name Modiodal in Japan. Also, there have been reported arrests of people who imported modafinil for personal use.

Romania
Modafinil is considered a stimulant doping agent and as such is prohibited in sports competitions, in the same category as steroids. Due to new laws passed in 2022, import into the country or selling is considered a felony and can be punished with jail time from 3 years to 7 years. Simple possession for personal use is still punished with just a fine and confiscation.

Russia
In Russia modafinil is Schedule II controlled substance like cocaine and morphine. Possession of few modafinil pills can lead to 3–10 years imprisonment.

Sweden
In Sweden, modafinil is classified as a schedule IV substance and possession is therefore illegal without prescription.

United States 
Modafinil is  classified as a Schedule IV controlled substance under United States federal law; it is illegal to import by anyone other than a DEA-registered importer without a prescription. The Clinton administration issued regulations in  effective January 27, 1999, based upon a recommendation of the administration's Assistant Secretary for Health.

However, one may legally bring modafinil into the United States in person from a foreign country, provided that he or she has a prescription for it, and the drug is properly declared at the border crossing. U.S. residents are limited to 50 dosage units (e.g., pills). Under the US Pure Food and Drug Act, drug companies are not allowed to market their drugs for off-label uses (conditions other than those officially approved by the FDA); Cephalon was reprimanded in 2002 by the FDA because its promotional materials were found to be "false, lacking in fair balance, or otherwise misleading". Cephalon pleaded guilty to a criminal violation and paid several fines, including  and  fines to the U.S. government in 2008.

Other countries
The following countries do not classify modafinil as a controlled substance:

 In Finland, modafinil is a prescription drug but not listed as a controlled substance.
 In Denmark, modafinil is a prescription drug but not listed as a controlled substance.
 Mexico (Not listed as a controlled substance, in the National Health Law. Can be purchased in pharmacies without prescription.)
 South Africa Schedule V
 United Kingdom (not listed in Misuse of Drugs Act so possession not illegal, but prescription required)

Sports use and issues

The regulation of modafinil as a doping agent has been controversial in the sporting world, with high-profile cases attracting press coverage since several prominent American athletes have tested positive for the substance. Some athletes who were found to have used modafinil protested that the drug was not on the prohibited list at the time of their offenses. However, the World Anti-Doping Agency (WADA) maintains that it was related to already banned substances. The Agency added modafinil to its list of prohibited substances on August 3, 2004, ten days before the start of the 2004 Summer Olympics.

Modafinil has received some publicity in the past when several athletes (such as sprinter Kelli White in 2004, cyclist David Clinger and basketball player Diana Taurasi in 2010, and rower Timothy Grant in 2015) were accused of using it as a performance-enhancing doping agent. Taurasi and another player, Monique Coker, tested at the same lab, were later cleared. It is not clear how widespread this practice is. The BALCO scandal brought to light an as-yet unsubstantiated (but widely published) account of Major League Baseball's all-time leading home-run hitter Barry Bonds' supplemental chemical regimen that included modafinil in addition to anabolic steroids and human growth hormone. Modafinil has been shown to prolong exercise time to exhaustion while performing at 85% of VO2max and also reduces the perception of effort required to maintain this threshold. Modafinil was added to the World Anti-Doping Agency "Prohibited List" in 2004 as a prohibited stimulant (see Modafinil Legal Status).

Research

Psychiatric conditions

Major depression
Modafinil has been studied in the treatment of major depressive disorder. In a 2021 systematic review and meta-analysis of randomized controlled trials of psychostimulants for depression, modafinil and other stimulants such as methylphenidate and amphetamines improved depression in traditional meta-analysis. However, when subjected to network meta-analysis, modafinil and most other stimulants did not significantly improve depression, with only methylphenidate remaining effective. Modafinil and other stimulants likewise did not improve quality of life in the meta-analysis, although there was evidence for reduced fatigue and sleepiness with modafinil and other stimulants. While significant effectiveness of modafinil for depression has been reported, reviews and meta-analyses note that the effectiveness of modafinil for depression is limited, the quality of available evidence is low, and more research is needed.

Bipolar depression
Modafinil and armodafinil have been repurposed as adjunctive treatments for acute depression in people with bipolar disorder. A 2021 meta-analysis found that add-on modafinil and armodafinil were more effective than placebo on response to treatment, clinical remission, and reduction in depressive symptoms, with only minor side effects, but the effect sizes are small and the quality of evidence has to be considered low, limiting the clinical relevance of current evidence. Very low rates of mood switch have been observed with modafinil and armodafinil in bipolar disorder.

Attention deficit hyperactivity disorder
Modafinil has been studied and reported to be effective in the treatment of attention deficit hyperactivity disorder (ADHD), with significantly less abuse potential than conventional psychostimulants like methylphenidate and amphetamines. In the United States, an application to market modafinil for pediatric ADHD was submitted to the FDA. However, approval was denied due to concerns about rare but serious dermatological toxicity (specifically, the occurrence of Stevens–Johnson syndrome). In any case, modafinil may be used off-label to treat ADHD in both children and adults. However, evidence of modafinil for treatment of adult ADHD is mixed, and a 2016 systematic review of alternative drug therapies for adult ADHD could not recommend its use in this context. In a large phase 3 clinical trial of modafinil for adult ADHD, modafinil was not effective in improving symptoms and there was a high rate of side effects (86%) and discontinuation (47%). The poor tolerability of modafinil in this study was possibly due to the use of excessively high doses (210–510 mg/day).

Substance dependence
Modafinil has been studied for the treatment of stimulant dependence.

Schizophrenia
Modafinil and armodafinil have been studied as a complement to antipsychotic medications in the treatment of schizophrenia. They have been consistently shown to have no effect on positive symptoms or cognitive performance. A 2015 meta-analysis found that modafinil and armodafinil may slightly reduce negative symptoms in people with acute schizophrenia, though it does not appear useful for people with the condition who are stable, with high negative symptom scores. Among medications demonstrated to be effective for reducing negative symptoms in combination with anti-psychotics, modafinil and armodafinil are among the smallest effect sizes.

Cognitive enhancement
A 2015 review of clinical studies of possible nootropic effects in healthy people found: "... whilst most studies employing basic testing paradigms show that modafinil intake enhances executive function, only half show improvements in attention and learning and memory, and a few even report impairments in divergent creative thinking. In contrast, when more complex assessments are used, modafinil appears to consistently engender enhancement of attention, executive functions, and learning. Importantly, we did not observe any preponderances for side effects or mood changes." A 2019 review of studies of a single-dose of modafinil on mental function in healthy, non-sleep deprived people found a statistically significant but small effect and concluded that the drug has limited usefulness as a cognitive enhancer in non-sleep deprived persons. A 2020 review of the cognitive enhancing potential of methylphenidate, d-amphetamine, and modafinil in healthy individuals across various domains found that modafinil has a small, positive effect on memory updating.

Modafinil has been used off-label in trials with people with symptoms of post-chemotherapy cognitive impairment, also known as "chemobrain", but a 2011 review found that it was no better than placebo. As of 2015 it had been studied for use in multiple sclerosis-associated fatigue, but the resulting evidence was weak and inconclusive.

Post-anesthesia sedation
General anesthesia is required for many surgeries, but there may be lingering fatigue, sedation, and/or drowsiness after surgery has ended that lasts for hours to days. In outpatient settings wherein patients are discharged home after surgery, this sedation, fatigue and occasional dizziness is problematic. As of 2006, modafinil had been tested and reported to be effective in one small (N=34) double-blind randomized controlled trial for this use.

Fatigue
Research on using modafinil to reduce multiple sclerosis (MS) fatigue has been inconclusive.

Postural orthostatic tachycardia syndrome
However, caution should be exercised in patients who have narcolepsy in comorbidity with postural orthostatic tachycardia syndrome (POTS). Therefore, there are potential warnings for a class of drugs used to treat narcolepsy. Centrally acting stimulants like modafinil are often considered first-line drugs for narcolepsy. However, modafinil stimulation increases POTS-related autonomic dysfunction and results in tachycardia/arrhythmia side effects in patients with cardiovascular risk factors. Sodium oxybate, a metabolite of GABA, is an alternative drug for stimulant-intolerant patients. Therefore, there is a potential for reconsidering the safety and use of stimulants such as modafinil as first-line therapy in patients with cardiac diseases such as POTS and arrhythmias.

References

External links 
 RxList Patient Information for modafinil users
 

1994 introductions
Acetamides
Anticonvulsants
Anti-inflammatory agents
Benzhydryl compounds
CYP3A4 inducers
D2-receptor agonists
Dermatoxins
Dopamine reuptake inhibitors
Drugs with unknown mechanisms of action
Nootropics
Stimulants
Sulfoxides
Wikipedia medicine articles ready to translate